Spodnja Pohanca is a village west of Artiče in the Municipality of Brežice in eastern Slovenia. The area is part of the traditional region of Styria. It is now included with the rest of the municipality in the Lower Sava Statistical Region.

References

External links
Spodnja Pohanca on Geopedia

Populated places in the Municipality of Brežice